Waitchie is a locality in Victoria, Australia, located approximately  from Swan Hill, Victoria.

A Post Office opened here on 18 February 1914 and closed in 1977.

References

Towns in Victoria (Australia)
Rural City of Swan Hill